Gumpendorfer Straße  is a station on  of the Vienna U-Bahn. It is located in the Mariahilf District. It opened in 1989.

References

External links 
 

Buildings and structures in Mariahilf
Railway stations opened in 1989
Vienna U-Bahn stations
Art Nouveau architecture in Vienna
Art Nouveau railway stations